The Renasant Convention Center is a convention complex located in downtown Memphis, Tennessee, United States. The building is East of the Mississippi River just south of Interstate 40. The building's raised exhibition space spans over North Front Street. It was formerly known as the Memphis Cook Convention Center.

Notable annual events include the Autozone national sales meeting, Memphis International Auto Show, and Mid-South Farm & Gin Show.

The complex was designed by Haglund and Venable Architects, Ellers & Reaves (Structural), and Allen & Hoshall (Mechanical) in 1967. The complex expanded to include The Cannon Center in 2003 under the design architect LMN Architects in association with a joint venture of Williamson Pounders Architects and Pickering

References

External links 

Convention centers in Tennessee